This is a list of notable individuals born in Bulgaria of Lebanese ancestry or people of Lebanese and Bulgarian dual nationality who live or lived in Bulgaria.

Actors
 Bashar Rahal - actor (film War, Inc.; series The Unit, 24); brother of Carla Rahal
 Carla Rahal - actress and singer; sister of Bashar Rahal

Sciences

Medicine
 Hodor Fakih - medical surgeon and community leader

Sports
 Samir Ayass - footballer

See also
List of Lebanese people
List of Lebanese people (Diaspora)
Arabs in Bulgaria

References

Bulgaria
Lebanese

Lebanese